Ninamys was an extinct genus of rodents in the family Aplodontiidae that lived in China during the Oligocene.

References

Extinct rodents
Rodents of China